Shaytan ("devil", plural: šayāṭīn (شَيَاطِين)) is an evil spirit in Islam, inciting humans (and the jinn) to sin by "whispering" (وَسْوَسَة, waswasa) in their hearts (قَلْب qalb). Although invisible to humans, they are imagined to be ugly and grotesque creatures created from hell-fire.

The Quran speaks of various ways that the shayāṭīn tempt humans into sin. They may teach sorcery, float below the heavens to steal the news of the angels, or lurk near humans without being seen. Iblis, called ash-shayṭān ("the devil" or "Satan"), is their leader. Hadith-literature holds the shayāṭīn responsible for various calamities which may affect personal life. Both the Hadith and folklore usually speak of the shayāṭīn in abstract terms, describing their evil influence only. During Ramadan, they are said to be chained in hell.

According to Muslim philosophical writings, the shayāṭīn struggle against the noble angels in the imaginal reality called  'ālam al-mithāl or 'ālam al-malakūt over the human mind, consisting of both angelic and devilish qualities. Some writers describe the shayāṭīn as expressions of God's fierce attributes and actions.

Etymology and terminology
The word Šaiṭān originated from the triliteral root š-ṭ-n ("distant, astray") and cognate to Satan. It has a theological connotation designating a creature distant from the divine mercy. In pre-Islamic Arabia, this term was used to designate an evil spirit, but only used by poets who were in contact with Jews and Christians. With the emergence of Islam, the meaning of shayatin moved closer to the Christian concept of devils. The term shayatin appears similarly in the Book of Enoch, denoting the hosts of Satan. Taken from Islamic sources, shayatin may be translated as "demons", satans or "devils".

Quran 

In the Qur'an, shayatin is mentioned as often as angels. The shayatin are mentioned less frequently than Satan, but they are equally hostile to God's order (sharia). They teach sorcery, inspire their friends to dispute with the faithful, make evil suggestions  towards both humans and jinn and secretly listen to the council of the angels.  speaks about the junud Iblis, the (invisible) hosts of Iblis (comparable to the junud of angels fighting along Muhammad in ). Yet, despite reluctant nature of the shayatin, they are ultimately under God's command, working as his instruments and not forming their party. It is God who leads astray and puts people on the straight path. Both good and evil are caused by God.

He makes people forgetful, (
) protects wicked nations, encourages to murder and rebellion and betrays his followers, as seen in the Battle of Badr.  explicitly warns people not to follow the devil, implying that humans are free to choose between God's or the devil's path. But the devil only promises delusion.  portrays the devil as a false friend, who betrays those who follow him. The devil can only act with God's permission. The Quranic story of Iblis, who represents the devils in the primordial fall, shows that the devils are both subordinative and made by God. The devil proclaims that he fears God ('akhafu 'llah), which can mean both, that he is reverencing or frightened about God (the latter one the preferred translation).

Hadith
The hadiths are more related to the practical function of the devils in everyday life. They usually speak about "the devil", instead of Iblis or devils, given the hadiths link them to their evil influences, not to them as proper personalities. Yet, hadiths indicate that they are composed of a body. The devils are said to eat with their left hand, therefore Muslims are advised to eat with their right hand. (Sahih Muslim Book 23 No. 5004) Devils, although invisible, are depicted as immensely ugly. (Sahih Muslim Book 26 No. 5428) The sun is said to set and rise between the horns of a devil and during this moment, the doors to hell are open, thus Muslims should not pray periodically at this time. (Sahih Muslim 612d Book 5, Hadith 222) The devils are chained in hell during Ramadan (Sahih al-Bukhari 1899). Devils are sent by Iblis to cause misery among humans and return to him for report.(Muslim 8:138)  A devil is said to tempt humans through their veins. (Muslim 2174) Devils try to interrupt ritual prayer, and if a devil succeeds in confusing a Muslim, the Muslim is supposed to prostrate two times and continue. (Sahih Bukhari 4:151) Satan and his minions battle the angels of mercy over the soul of a sinner; however, they are referred to as angels of punishment instead of shayatin. (Sahih Muslim 612d: Book 21, Hadith 2622)

Muslim scholarly interpretation 
When it comes to the issue of invisible creatures, mufassirs usually focus on devils and evil jinn and although they are similar in threatening humans, they are distinguished by one another. While the jinn shares many attributes with humans, like having free will, and the ability to reason, and thus different types of believers (Muslims, Christians, Jews, polytheists, etc.), the devils are exclusively evil. Further, the jinn have a limited lifespan, but the devils die only when their leader ceases to exist. The father of the jinn is Al-Jann and the father of the devils is Iblis. 

Engku Ansaruddin Agus states that jinn, shaitan, and iblis are three different things; Iblis is the name, given by God, to an angel (Azazil) who disobeyed. Shaitan is a title for those who join Azazil's army, trained to destroy humans. Abu Mufti distinguishes in his commentary of Abu Hanifa's "al-Fiqh al-absat" that all angels, except Harut and Marut, are obedient. But all devils, except Ham ibn Him ibn Laqis Ibn Iblis, are created evil. Al-Damiri reports from ibn Abbas, that the angels will be in paradise, the devils will be in hell, and among the jinn and humans, some will be in paradise and some will be in hell. Only humans and jinn are created with fitra, meaning both angels and devils lack free will and are settled in opposition. 

Neither the origin of the devils nor their creation is described in the Quran. Since their leader describes themselves in the Quran as being "created from fire", devils are thought to be created from that. More precisely, sometimes considered the fires of hell in origin. Most mufassirs agree that the devils are the offspring of Iblis. Abu Ishaq al-Tha'labi reports that God offered Iblis support by giving him offspring, which are the devils. Others describe the devils as fallen spirits (sometimes heavenly jinn, sometimes fiery angels), outcast from the presence of God. Ibn Barrajan argues that the angels consist of two tribes: One created from light and one from fire, the latter being the devils. Ibn Arabi describes the jinn as fire-made spiritual entities from the spiritual world. When they disobey God, they turn into devils. Qadi Baydawi argues that devils are perhaps not essentially different from angels, but differ only in their accidents and qualities.

Since the term shaitan is also used as an epithet to describe malevolent jinn (and humans), it is sometimes difficult to properly distinguish between devils and evil jinn in some sources. Generally, Satan and his hosts of devils (shayatin) appear in traditions associated with Jewish and Christian narratives, while jinn represent entities of polytheistic background.

Devils are linked to Muslim ritual purity. Ritual purity is important in attracting angels, while devils approach impurity and filthy or desacralized places. Before reciting the Quran, Muslims should take wudu/abdest and seek refuge in God from the devils. Reciting specific prayers is supposed to protect against the influence of the devils.

Philosophy 
Islamic philosophical cosmology divides living beings into four categories: Animals, humans, angels, and devils. Al-Farabi (c. 872 – 950/951) defines angels as reasonable and immortal beings, humans as reasonable and mortal beings, animals as unreasonable and mortal beings, and devils as unreasonable and immortal beings. He supports his claim with the Quranic verse in which God grants Iblis respite until the day of resurrection. 

Likewise, al-Ghazali (c. 1058 – 19 December 1111) divides human nature into four domains, each representing another type of creature: Animals, beasts, devils, and angels. Traits humans share with bodily creatures are animals, which exist to regulate ingestion and procreation and the beasts, used for predatory actions like hunting. The other traits humans share with the jinn and root in the realm of the unseen. These faculties are of two kinds: That of angels and the devils. While the angels endow the human mind with reason, advise virtues, and lead to worship of God, the devil perverts the mind and tempts it to commit lies, betrayals, and deceits, thus abusing the spiritual gift. The angelic nature instructs how to use the animalistic body properly, while the devil perverts it. In this regard, the plane of a human is, unlike who's of the jinn and animals, not pre-determined. Humans are potentially both angels and devils, depending on whether the sensual soul or the rational soul develops.

The Brethren of Purity understand devils as ontological forces, manifesting in everything evil.

Following the cosmology of Wahdat al-Wujud, Haydar Amuli specifies that angels reflect God's names of light and beauty, while the devils' God's attributes of "Majesty", "The Haughty" and "Domineering". Ibn Arabi, to whom Haydar Amuli's cosmology is attributed to, although making a clear distinction between the devils and the angels, interpreted devils as beings of a similar function to that of angels, as sent and predescribed by God, in his Al-Futuhat al-Makkiyya.

Sufi writers connect the descriptions of devils mentioned in hadith literature to human psychological conditions. Devilish temptations are distinguished from the angelic assertions, by that the angels suggest piety by sharia, the devils against God's law and sinful acts. He further elaborates an esoteric cosmology, visualizing a human's heart as the capital of the body, in constant struggle between reason ('aql) and carnal desires invoked by the devils. Ali Hujwiri similarly describes the devils and angels mirroring the human psychological condition, the devils and carnal desires (nafs) on one side, and the spirit (ruh) and the angels on the other. The evil urges related to the al-nafs al-ammarah in Sufism are also termed div.

See also
 Asrestar
 Dajjal
 Ghoul
 Marid
 Qareen
 Superstitions in Muslim societies

Notes

References

Demons in Islam
Jahannam
Occultism (Islam)
Satan